The common keelback (Tropidonophis mairii), also known as Mair's keelback,  is a species of nonvenomous snake in the family Colubridae. The species is endemic to Australasia.

Etymology
The specific name, mairii, is in honor of "Dr. Mair", an army surgeon with the 39th Regiment of Foot, who collected the holotype.

Geographic range
T. mairii is found in Australia, Indonesia, New Guinea, and Papua New Guinea.

Description
Dorsally, T. mairii is olive, brown, or blackish, with small black spots, or with black crossbars anteriorly. Ventrally, it is lighter. The subcaudals and often also the ventrals are edged with black. The dorsal scales are strongly keeled, and arranged in 15 rows at midbody.

T. mairii resembles some Australian venomous snakes, the taipans (genus Oxyuranus) and the rough-scaled snake (Tropidechis carinatus).  

Diet
Mair's keelback feeds mainly on amphibians and small lizards. It is one of the few snakes that can eat cane toads (Rhinella marina), up to a certain size, without being harmed.

Reproduction
T. mairii is oviparous.

References

Further reading
Cogger HG (2014). Reptiles and Amphibians of Australia, Seventh Edition. Clayton, Victoria, Australia: CSIRO Publishing. xxx + 1,033 pp. .
GRAY JE (1841). "A Catalogue of the Species of Reptiles and Amphibia hitherto described as inhabiting Australia, with a description of some New Species from Western Australia, and some remarks on their geographical distribution". Appendix E, pp. 422–449. In: GREY G (1841). Journals of Two Expeditions of Discovery in North-west and Western Australia, During the Years 1837, 38, and 39, Under the Authority of Her Majesty's Government. In Two Volumes. Vol. II. London: T. and W. Boone. 520 pp. (Tropidonotus mairii, new species, p. 442).
Wilson, Steve; Swan, Gerry (2013). A Complete Guide to Reptiles of Australia, Fourth Edition. Sydney: New Holland Publishers. 522 pp. .

Reptiles of Western Australia
Tropidonophis
Taxa named by John Edward Gray
Reptiles described in 1841
Snakes of Australia
IUCN Red List data deficient species